Ðặng Hiếu Hiền (born 20 October 1966) is a Vietnamese boxer. He competed in the men's light flyweight event at the 1988 Summer Olympics.

References

External links
 

1966 births
Living people
Vietnamese male boxers
Olympic boxers of Vietnam
Boxers at the 1988 Summer Olympics
Place of birth missing (living people)
Light-flyweight boxers